Nimura (written:  lit. "two villages" or ) is a Japanese surname. Notable people with the surname include:

, Japanese violinist
, Japanese footballer
, Japanese baseball player
Janice P. Nimura (active 2022), American author

Japanese-language surnames